Ivanovka is a rural locality (a settlement) in Kabansky District, Republic of Buryatia, Russia. The population was 51 as of 2010. There are 3 streets.

Geography 
Ivanovka is located 82 km southwest of Kabansk (the district's administrative centre) by road. Klyuyevka is the nearest rural locality.

References 

Rural localities in Kabansky District
Populated places on Lake Baikal